The Groupe Vendome SA was a French cosmetics holding company based in Dijon. The company was established in April 2002 as a result of management buyout arranged by the management team with a €33 million investment from the private equity fund i3.

The company operated several cosmetic brands notably Le Petit Marseillais (shower gels, soaps, baths and hair care products), Laboratories Vendome (skin care products for sensitive skin) and Prim'Age (baby toiletries brand).

It was acquired by Johnson & Johnson in 2006 and merged into Johnson & Johnson Santé Beauté France SAS in 2011. Laboratoires Vendome remained as an independent cosmetic brand within the new company.

History 
The history of Groupe Vendôme SA dates back to 1919 when Lucien Monot started a pharmaceutical company Laboratoire Monot in Dijon.

1946 – Pierre Monot, son of the founder, inherited the business.

1967 – Marcel Elias joined the company as an accountant at the age of 24.

1972 – Marcel Elias became general manager and head of the board.

1976 – Gérard Monot headed the company.

1981 – The company started building national distribution and enters cosmetics and personal care market.

1984 – "Laboratoires Vendôme" created as a company and as a brand of personal care cosmetics.

1984 – "Laboratoires Vendôme" acquires "Le Petit Marseillais" brand.

1985 – "Le Petit Marseillais" brand launched into supermarkets with three types of soaps: green, natural white and rose.

1996 – Monot family sells pharmaceutical business to Germany's Merck KGaA.

1998 – Cosmetics business splits into two distinct brands "Le Petit Marseillais" and "Laboratoires Vendôme" (with "Prim'Age Bébé", "Classic" and "Dermatologic" product lines).

2002 – Marcel Elias arranges management buyout of "Laboratoires Vendôme". Groupe Vendôme SA becomes a holding company managing several brands including "Laboratoires Vendôme". By 2002 the company reached €121 million turnover in personal care products.

2006 – Groupe Vendôme SA acquired by Johnson & Johnson.

2007 - Marcel Elias leaves the company.

2011 - Groupe Vendôme SA merged into Johnson & Johnson Santé Beauté France SAS. Laboratoires Vendome stays as a brand name.

2016 - Groupe Vendôme SA was fined by Autorité de la concurrence in France in 2016 for price-fixing on personal hygiene products.

Brands

Le Petit Marseillais 
"Le Petit Marseillais" (Little Boy from Marseille) is the biggest brand, comprising roughly 70 percent of the company's sales.

1981 – The brand was established by Bernard Lengellé, a former journalist of "Dauphiné Libéré" newspaper who revived the old recipe of famous Marseilles soap (probably dating back to 1921) and started selling it to pharmacies in Vaucluse. The brand was most likely named after popular newspaper "Le Petit Marseillais" that ceased to exist in 1944.

1984 – "Le Petit Marseillais" was acquired by "Laboratoires Vendôme" for 100.000 or 200.000 francs (around €15 000 Euro). New owners took the business further, relaunching it to supermarkets in 1985.

1986 – Soap brand with story of natural ingredients and Provence origin became popular. By 1986 "Le Petit Marseillais" soap gained 6 percent market share in France.

1989 – Shower gels were launched.

1992 – Liquid soaps introduced to the market.

By 1998 the brand added shower gels, bubble baths, liquid soaps and kids products to the product range.

2003 – Launch of shampoos with the accent on "the authenticity and naturalness, inspired by the Mediterranean origin" and grew the market share in shampoos to 4.1 percent by the end of the year.

Explaining communication "formula" of "Le Petit Marseillais" Stéphanie Perrouty notes that it typically includes "a moment of pleasure and care" as well as characteristics of flavours ("delicate fruit notes", "delicate fresh notes", "intense accents for gourmet", "gourmet fruit notes" etc.).

The brand stands for naturalness, Provence origin and unique combination of fragrances like apple and kiwi, peach and apricot, cherry and almond.

Other brands 
In spring 2005 the company acquired cosmetic brands "Persavon", "La Perdrix" and "Parfumerie Bernard" from :fr: Savonnerie et parfumerie Bernard.

References 

Chemical companies established in 2002
Cosmetics companies of France
Companies based in Bourgogne-Franche-Comté